Russia has an embassy in Algiers and a consulate in Annaba, and Algeria has an embassy in Moscow. Algeria currently enjoys very strong relations with Russia.

Background
Cold War Era

Throughout the Algerian War of Independence, the Soviet Union had been providing military, technical and material assistance to Algeria. The USSR was the first country in the world to de facto recognize the Provisional Government of the Algerian Republic in October 1960, and then de jure on March 23, 1962, by establishing diplomatic relations with this country (a few months before the official proclamation of its independence).

In December 1963, the Soviet Union and Algeria signed an agreement on economic and technical cooperation. The USSR committed itself to provide assistance in reconstructing and building industrial plants, agricultural development, geological exploration, personnel training, etc. The Soviet Union granted Algeria a long-term loan in the amount of 90 million rubles. In May 1964, the countries signed an agreement, under which the USSR agreed to provide technical assistance in the construction of a metallurgical plant in the city of Annaba (another long-term loan of 115 million rubles was granted for these needs).

The head of the Algerian Government Houari Boumediène visited the Soviet Union in December 1965 and June–July 1967. In 1967, Algeria temporarily cut off relations with USA. The Chairman of the Presidium of the Supreme Soviet of the USSR Nikolai Podgorny paid an official visit to Algeria in late March - early April 1969.

Newly independent, Algeria recognized the importance of  'unity and convergence' in Third World countries in order to achieve domestic goals. This could be expressed by their support of the non-aligned movement, which began with the FLN's involvement in the 1960s.

Algeria was close with the Soviet regime in the 1970s and 1980s because of the supply of arms. The approximation by the Russian press is that 'Moscow supplied 11 billion dollars in military equipment to Algeria between 1962 and 1989, equal to 70-80 percent of Algeria's inventory' and this deal mainly came about through the use of loans. In 1993, it was estimated that 90% of Algerian army's inventory was of Soviet origin.

At the same time as these relations were occurring, Algeria had taken an active stance in the Non-Aligned Movement. In 1973, Houari Boumediène hosted the Non-Aligned Movement in Algiers. According to historians it was 'with the observation that recent co-operation between Moscow and Washington looked very much like a superpower 'pretension to reign over the world". Boumediène cooperated closely with Moscow and Washington on bilateral levels but his view, iterated by hosting the Non-Aligned summit, was not one of supporting either side in the Cold War. One of the main points emphasized at Bandung, the birthplace of the Non Aligned movement, was that the Third World countries should take a stand against colonialism and neo-colonialism. In a post-colonial Algeria, subscribing to this view was a necessity. By the mid-1970s, Algeria was fully engaged in the zenith of the Non-Aligned Movement, wary of imperial powers which looked down upon the Third World. Nevertheless, presidential visits, diplomatic ties, and cordial bilateral relations continued with the two superpowers.

Post Cold War 

A different atmosphere was on the rise in the 1990s as Algeria stopped making the loan repayments to Russia, and after Putin's rise, Algeria joined NATO'S "Mediterranean Dialogue" with other Middle Eastern countries such as Egypt.

Bouteflika's presidency, which began in April 1999, was followed shortly by Putin's presidency and the two leaders pushed for the return to more cordial relations, including discussions of arms sales and economic cooperation. In 2006, Algeria's 5.7 billion dollar debt was forgiven, and Algeria gave a 7.5 billion dollar arms deal to Russia, the first major African arms deal of Russian Federation. Bilateral relations at this point regained in strength.

Recent relations

3–6 April 2001, an official visit to Moscow, President of Algeria Abdelaziz Bouteflika, give a new quality to bilateral relations and has become a major milestone in the expansion of Russian-Algerian relations. During the visit, the parties signed a declaration on strategic partnership between the two countries and an intergovernmental agreement on cooperation in culture, science, education, sports, tourism and archives.
September 24, 2003, in New York during the regular session of the UN General Assembly meeting of the heads of the two states. Andrii was present as a guest at the summit of "Eight", in particular, on Sea Island in July 2004, Gleneagles in July 2005 and Heiligendamm in June 2007, which also held a brief meeting with Putin A.Buteflikoy. Medvedev spoke July 7, 2008 with A.Buteflikoy at the summit of the "Group of Eight" in Toyako. July 9, 2009 Medvedev "crop" of the meeting of Heads of State and Government of the "Group of Eight" in L'Aquila, Italy adopted the Algerian premier Ahmed Ouyahia The next meeting of the presidents of Russia and Algeria on 24 September 2009 on the margins of the UN session in New York.
March 10, 2006, an official visit of the Russian President in Algeria. Intergovernmental agreement on trade, economic and financial relations and the settlement of debts of the Algerian People's Democratic Republic to the Russian Federation on earlier loans, the convention on the avoidance of double taxation and the Agreement on encouragement and reciprocal protection of investments.
18–19 February 2008,an official visit of the President of Algeria Abdelaziz Bouteflika to Moscow. "In the fields" visit the signing of the Agreement between the Government of the Russian Federation and  the Government of Algeria on air traffic between the two countries.
October 6, 2010, Russian President Dmitry Medvedev paid an official visit to Algeria. During the visit, agreements were signed between the Government of the Russian Federation and the Government of the Algerian People's Democratic Republic on Cooperation in the field of maritime transport, and five Memoranda: between the Federal Agency for Technical Regulation and Metrology and the Algerian Institute for Standardization of Understanding on cooperation in the field of standardization and conformity assessment between the Ministry of Energy of the Russian Federation and the Ministry of Energy and Mines PDRA on cooperation in the gas sector, the Ministry of Energy of the Russian Federation and the Ministry of Energy and Mines PDRA on cooperation in the fuel and energy complex, between the Diplomatic Academy of the Russian Foreign Ministry and the Institute of Diplomacy and International Relations Foreign Ministry Andrei cooperation between the Public Chamber of the Russian Federation and the National Economic and Social Council of the PDRA on cooperation.

Established inter-parliamentary relations. 
 In September 1998, in Moscow to attend the 100th Inter-Parliamentary Conference was Chairman of the Council of Nation (upper house). During an official visit to Russia, 22–26 September 1999 Chairman of the National People's Assembly (lower house) of Algeria A.Bensalaha signed (September 23) Cooperation Agreement between the State Duma of Russia and NIS Algeria. 
 March 28–31, 2000 in Algiers, with a return visit visited the Russian parliamentarians led by the Chairman of the State Duma of the RF. 
29–30 March 2005 an official visit in Algeria delegation headed by Chairman of the Federation Council. 
July 10–14, 2006 the President of the Council of Nation PDRA A.Bensalah visited Russia. 
27–30 October 2008, Russia adopted the delegation of the National People's Congress PDRA led by its Chairman A.Ziari.
October 2000, the first in the history of bilateral relations between the working visit of the Minister of Foreign Affairs of Russia to Algeria. 
In April 2003 he received a working visit to Moscow by the Minister of State, Minister of Foreign Affairs Andrei. 
November 23, 2005 in Algeria during his working visit to the Maghreb countries visited Lavrov. Return visit of Foreign Minister of Algeria in Moscow on 12–14 April 2007 21–22 March 2011 Sergey Lavrov paid a working visit to Andre (during his visit to Egypt and Algeria).

Economic Relations
Economic and trade cooperation was carried out between the two countries since the 1960s. Algeria needed assistance in creating a national industrial base and the development of industries such as energy, mining and metallurgy, engineering, water management, etc. So, the USSR helped in setting up much of the steel plant facilities in El Hajar, metallurgical plant in Annaba, TPP g.Zhizhel, gas-Alrar Tinfuye-Hassi Messaoud, the dam "Beni Zid" etc.
In June 1993, an agreement on the establishment of the Joint m ezhpravitelstvennoy Russian-Algerian commission on trade-economic and scientific-technical cooperation . Chairman of the Russian part of the commission - Energy Minister Sergei Shmatko. Chairman of the Algerian - Finance Minister K.Dzhudi. 29–30 June 2010 in Algiers, the fourth meeting of the Joint Russian-Algerian intergovernmental commission on trade-economic and scientific-technical cooperation. The fifth meeting of CMEC held in Moscow in November 2011
Algeria is (along with Morocco and Egypt), the top three trade partners of Russia in Africa. According to the Federal Customs Service of Russia, in 2010, bilateral trade amounted to 1337 million.
In Algeria, the consortium operates OJSC "NK" Rosneft "- OJSC" Stroytransgaz ", which is involved in the development of hydrocarbons in Block-245 south (Illizi province). In April 2008, "Stroytransgas" passed temporary operation Sougueur-Hadjret Ennous length of 273 km. At present JSC "Stroytransgaz" is completing the renovation and reconstruction project pipeline GK-1 (150 km). OAO "Gazprom" is working on exploration and development in Algeria's hydrocarbon reserves in the license area El Assel (three blocks with total area of 3083 km2. Geologically Berkin basin in the south). In March–June 2010, a group of "Gazprom" to drill the first exploration well in Africa in the perimeter of El Assel.
Anchored in the Algerian market of "Zarubezhvodstroy", the works for the construction of dams, aqueducts and tunnels, and the Algerian company with 100% Russian capital of JSC "Bardell and Company", a wide range of building works.
JSC "VO" Technopromexport "continues to repair and maintenance work on the TPP" Jijel ", service and supply of spare parts for the TPP" Annaba. "
November 28, 2002 from the Plesetsk cosmodrome launched missile carrier "Space" the first Algerian scientific satellite "Alsat-1."
April 27 - May 3, 2010 in Moscow and St. Petersburg were organized Days of Algerian culture in Russia, which was attended by Minister of Culture PDRA H.Tumi. December 14–18, 2010 in Moscow, the Week of Algerian cinema. The Days of Russian Culture in Algeria is scheduled for 12–19 October 2011
In Algeria, there are over 13 thousand graduates of our civil and military schools.

Russian Embassy 
The Russian embassy is located in Algiers.

 Ambassador Valeryan Vladimirovich Shuvaev

Algerian Embassy 
The Algerian embassy is located in Moscow.

References

 
Africa–Russia relations
Bilateral relations of Russia
Russia